Mozaffarov Mansur Äxmät ulı (pronounced ),  Mansur Mozaffarov; Tatar Cyrillic: Мозаффаров Мансур Әхмәт улы; , Muzafarov Mansur Akhmetovich; 1902 – 1966) was a Tatar composer and pedagogue. TASSR Honoured Worker of Culture (1950), People's Artist of TASSR (1964). Mansur was a son of Tatar emancipatress Mahruy Mozaffariä. Mansur Mozaffarov is one of the founding fathers of Tatar professional music.

Since 1945 he lectured in Kazan Conservatory, and between 194 and 1961 headed Composition chain.

Major works: Ğäliäbanu (1940), Zölxäbirä (wasn't staged) operas, symphony (1944), symphonic poems in commemoration of Ğabdulla Tuqay and Mullanur Waxitov (1952, 1956), two concertos for viola with orchestra (1959, 1962), vocal and instrumental concertos, recording and arrangement of folk songs. Mozaffarov was the Ğabdulla Tuqay TASSR State Prize laureate in 1959.

References and notes

1902 births
1966 deaths
Tatar people of the Soviet Union
Soviet composers
Soviet male composers
Tatar music
Academic staff of Kazan Conservatory